James Clark (14 March 1871 – 6 June 1941) was an Australian cricketer. He played two first-class matches for Queensland between 1898 and 1900.

References

External links
 

1871 births
1941 deaths
Australian cricketers
Queensland cricketers
Sportsmen from Queensland